"Sweet Lies" is a song performed by British drum and bass music producer and DJ Wilkinson, featuring vocals from English singer Karen Harding. The song was released as a digital download on 9 September 2016 in the United Kingdom by RAM Records as the second single from his second studio album Hypnotic (2017). The song peaked at number 98 on the Scottish Singles Chart.

The song blends elements of "Street Life" by The Crusaders with "Sweet Harmony" by Liquid, which itself sampled from CeCe Rogers' seminal house track, "Someday".

Music video
A music video to accompany the release of "Sweet Lies" was first released onto YouTube on 24 October 2016. The video has since accumulated over 14 million views.

Track listing

Charts

Certifications

Release history

References

2016 songs
2016 singles
Wilkinson (musician) songs
Karen Harding songs